
The Genoa Metro is a rapid transit consisting of a single line that connects the centre of Genoa, Italy with the suburb of Rivarolo Ligure, to the north-west of the city centre.  The service is currently managed by Azienda Mobilità e Trasporti (AMT), which provides public transport for the city of Genoa.

It has a direct connection with the underground suburban station under Trenitalia's mainline railway station, Principe.

History 
The origins of a subway in Genoa date back to the beginning of the twentieth century; in 1907 Carlo Pfalz, who had already designed the Zecca-Righi funicular, was the first to explore the construction of an underground railway with electric traction. Several projects, including that of the engineer Angelo Massardo and those of Renzo Picasso (1911 and 1930), were proposed without being realized. Instead, a tram system was built  which was abandoned in 1966.
The only attempt to introduce an alternative means of transport was made on the occasion of the International Exhibition of Marine and Maritime Hygiene of 1914: it was Telfer, an elevated monorail that connected the Port (Giano Pier area) to the exhibition area in Piazza di Francia, in front of the Brignole station. The infrastructure was then abandoned and finally demolished in 1918.

The line was extended to Principe in 1992, to San Giorgio-Caricamento in 2003, to De Ferrari (underground station at Piazza De Ferrari) in 2005, and to Brignole in 2012.

From 1 December 2021 it has been free to use in off peak times (10:00-16:00 and 20:00-22:00) courtesy of the Municipality of Genoa and AMT.

Rolling stock

First Generation 
The first generation rolling stock on the system consists of 6 sets of articulated cars. They were built by Ansaldo, and introduced in 1990. They are derived from the Tram2000 tram used in Switzerland, however they differ in being standard gauge. Each vehicle consists of two sections with one central articulation, which are supported by three bogies, the two outer bogies are motored, which the central bogie does not. The vehicles are bidirectional and have four sets of door on each side.

The interior of the cars consists of blue seats in a transverse arrangement. The train are numbered 01 to 06.

Second Generation 
The second generation of train on the line is made up of a group of 12 trains. Numbered 12 to 24. These trains, like the first generation, each train is made up of two sections resting on three bogies, with the outer two motored and the middle one non-motored. The trains are also bidirectional, however have six doors on each side, and the seats are arranged longitudinally. The trains were built by Ansaldo and introduced in 1992.

Third Generation 
The most recent units on the line, those of the third generation, significantly differ to the previous two. They were delivered by Hitachi Rail Italy in 2016. There are 7 trains numbered 31 to 37. The trains are longer than previous generations at 39 meters and four articulated sections with five bogies. Of the five bogies, the central three are motored, which the outer two are not. There is a total four doors per each side of the bidirectional sets.

Fourth generation
In anticipation of the planned extensions and considering the now thirty-year service of the first generation trains, in 2020 the Municipality obtained a loan of 70 million Euros to purchase 14 new generation trains. In 2021 Hitachi Rail signed the contract to supply the new trains: it is expected that this supply will be delivered on a monthly basis (one train per month) between 2023 and 2024, coinciding with the inauguration of the Brin-Canepari and Brignole-Martinez routes.

Future

In March 2018, the Italian government announced the investment for an extension of one station at either end of the line, Canepari to the northwest and Martinez to the east. In addition, a further three train sets would be bought to accommodate the extension. 

A westward branch from Dinegro to Fiumara, with intermediate stations at Cantore and Genova Sampierdarena railway station, is planned to be complete by 2026 or 2027. This extension would be entirely underground with an estimated construction cost of €400 million. An elevated line running northward from Brignole, referred to as SkyTram, is also proposed.

List of stations 
 Canepari
 Brin
 Dinegro
 Principe (at Principe railway station)
 Darsena
 San Giorgio
 Sarzano/Sant'Agostino
 De Ferrari

 Brignole (at Brignole railway station)

Network Map

See also
 List of metro systems

References

Bibliography 
 Paolo Gassani: Genova verso la metropolitana leggera. In: ″I Treni Oggi″ Nr. 27 (February 1983), p. 11–13.

External links

 AMT Genoa - Metro official website 
 Unofficial site and forum about Genoa underground and public transport 
 Genoa at UrbanRail.net
 Genoa Metropolitana at public-transport.net

 
Railway lines in Liguria
Railway lines opened in 1990
1990 establishments in Italy
750 V DC railway electrification
[[Category:Transportation]